The Broadcast Engineering Conservation Group (BECG) conserves historic broadcasting equipment. It is based at Hemswell Cliff in Lincolnshire, England and is a Charitable incorporated organisation.

The group was founded by people with large private collections of broadcasting equipment, including several Outside Broadcast (OB) vehicles. Some vehicles have been fully restored, while others are works in progress. The group is led by six trustees, most of them working or retired broadcast industry professionals.

A newsletter called Line-Up is published a few times each year and back issues are available on the BECG website, as is a 3D virtual tour.

Broadcast Engineering Museum
In November 2021, the group bought the former RAF Sergeants' Mess at Hemswell Cliff. The building will provide a permanent home for the collection and forms the Broadcast Engineering Museum. As well as the main building, there are east and west wings of similar size and two large function rooms and workshops behind.

This building had been unused for 12 years and needed a lot of repairs. The local authority, West Lindsey District Council, provided BECG with funding towards the repair of broken windows.

Since acquiring the building, repairs and improvements have been made by both contractors and volunteers. In the first year vegetation was cut back, uneven ground levelled, leaking roofs repaired, drains unblocked and over 150 broken window panes replaced. A solar PV array was installed on the main south-facing roof and a CCTV system provided.

Two large rooms were converted into videotape and telecine display areas. The videotape area contains several 2" quadruplex and 1" C-format machines as well as more modern formats. The telecine area contains machines capable of scanning 8, 9.5, 16 and 35mm film.

In September 2022, BECG held its first public open days as part of the Heritage Open Days scheme and had about 200 visitors. About half were from the local area and half from further afield.

To date, the museum only opens for visitors on special occasions or for groups by appointment.

Collection
Major items in the collection include:

Videotape equipment

2-inch quadruplex
 Ampex VR-2000
 Ampex AVR-2
 Ampex AVR-3
 RCA TR70B (405/525/625-line)

1-inch C-format
 Ampex VPR-3
 Marconi MR2B in 'table top' format
 Marconi MR2Bs: editing pair in console format
 Sony BVH-2000PS
 Sony BVH-3100PS

1-inch B-format
 Bosch Fernseh machine from 1976

Studio cameras
 EMI 203, 2001 and 2005
 Ikegami HK323, HK355W
 IVC 7000P
 Link 125
 Marconi MkII, MkIII, MkIV, MkVIII, MkIX
 Philips LDK5
 Vinten pedestals (various types)

Film and telecine equipment
 Marconi B3402 'island' telecine
 Marconi B3410 line array telecine
 Rank Cintel Mk3 telecine
 Acmade 'Mineola' 16mm editor
 Cineola editor
 Steenbeck 16/35mm flat editing table with magnetic and optical sound
 Panavision 'Panaflex' 35mm camera from 1972

Audio equipment
 Mole-Richardson 103B microphone boom
 Consoles from Audix, Glensound, Neve, Soundcraft

Outside broadcast vehicles
 Southern: aka Big Bertha, possibly the oldest working colour OB scanner in the world
 Yorkshire-Tyne Tees: originally a Yorkshire TV scanner but currently in Tyne Tees livery
 BBC mobile videotape unit LMVT1 (originally with two Ampex AVR1 quadruplex VTRs)
 Project Vivat: a re-creation of a 1950s Marconi-equipped BBC OB unit with three working Marconi Mk III cameras; ex-BBC vehicle was originally MCR23.
 BBC Type 5 colour vehicle LO6 (CMCR20)
 BBC compact CMCR LO21 (CMCR39)
 ABC-Thames: originally ABC's monochrome OB truck, converted to colour by Thames TV
 P5: ex-BBC 27 kVA diesel generator on a petrol-powered truck. One of a batch of ten. 1952 Bedford type ML chassis, fitted with 6-cylinder diesel generator in 1953.
 BBC radio car: one of ten Peugeot 807 cars equipped by dB Broadcast in 2005 for use by local radio stations

Transmitter equipment
 A CAT9 (Cooled Anode Triode) transmitter valve

References

Broadcast engineering
Television organisations in the United Kingdom
Museums in Lincolnshire
West Lindsey District
Organisations based in Lincolnshire